Louis C. Schmitt Jr. (born March 21, 1962) is an American attorney and politician serving as a member of the Pennsylvania House of Representatives from the 79th district since 2019.

Early life and education 
Schmitt was born on March 21, 1962 in the Dutch Hill neighborhood of Altoona, Pennsylvania. He graduated from Altoona Area High School in 1980. Schmitt earned a Bachelor of Arts degree in political science and history from Saint Francis University in 1984 and a Juris Doctor from the Franklin Pierce Law Center in 1987.

Career 
From 1993 to 2018, Schmitt was a law partner at McIntyre, Hartye, Schmitt, and Sosnowski. He was elected to represent the 79th Pennsylvania House of Representatives District in 2018. He currently serves on the Appropriations Committee, Insurance Committee, serves as secretary for the State Government Committee, and chairs the Transportation Subcommittee on Railroads.

Personal life
Schmitt lives in Logan Township, Blair County, Pennsylvania with his wife Helen; the couple have two daughters.

References 

Living people
People from Altoona, Pennsylvania
Saint Francis University alumni
University of New Hampshire School of Law alumni
Pennsylvania lawyers
Republican Party members of the Pennsylvania House of Representatives
21st-century American politicians
1962 births